Simone Muench is an American poet and a professor of creative writing and film studies. She was raised in the small town of Benson, Louisiana and also Arkansas. She completed her bachelor's and master's degrees at the University of Colorado in Boulder, received her Ph.D from the University of Illinois at Chicago and is director of the Writing Program at Lewis University in Romeoville.

She is the author of five books: The Air Lost in Breathing (Marianne Moore Prize for Poetry; Helicon Nine, 2000), Lampblack & Ash (Kathryn A. Morton Prize for Poetry; Sarabande, 2005), and Orange Crush (Sarabande, 2010), Disappearing Address,  a collaboration of epistolary poems co-written with Philip Jenks (BlazeVOX Books, 2010), and the upcoming Wolf Centos (Sarabande, 2014). Her chapbook Trace received the Black River Chapbook Award and was published by Black Lawrence Press in 2014.

Awards and achievements 
 NEA Fellowship for Poetry : 2013
 New City’s Lit 50 “Who Really Books in Chicago” 2014 list : 2014
 Artsmith Residency Fellowship : 2014
 Yaddo Writers Residency : 2013
 Vermont Studio Center Fellowships : 2011, 2013
 Interviewed by Daniel Handler for the September 2010 issue of The Believer
 Chief Faculty Advisor for Jet Fuel Review
 Lewis Faculty Scholar Award : 2013
 Kentucky Women Writers Conference : 2010
 Illinois Arts Council Fellowships : 2009
 Recipient of the PSA’s Bright Lights/Big Verse Contest with a featured reading in Times Square;
 Black Lawrence Chapbook Contest for Trace : 2012

List of works

Books 
 The Air Lost in Breathing (Helicon Nine, 2000)
 Lampblack & Ash (Sarabande, 2005)
 Orange Crush (Sarabande, 2010)
 Disappearing Address with Philip Jenks (BlazeVOX, 2010)
 Wolf Centos (Sarabande, 2014)
 Suture with Dean Rader (Black Lawrence, 2017)

Chapbooks 
 Trace (Black Lawrence Press, 2014)
 Little Visceral Carnival (Cinematheque Press, 2009)
 Orange Girl (Dancing Girl Press, 2007)
 Sonoluminescence (Dusie Press, 2007)
 Notebook. Knife. Mentholatum (New Michigan Press, 2003)

References

External links 
 http://simonemuench.com/
 http://www.blacklawrence.com/author/simone-muench/
 https://archive.today/20140709200455/http://www.sarabandebooks.org/new-forthcoming/wolf-centos-simone-muench-1

Year of birth missing (living people)
Living people
21st-century American poets
University of Colorado Boulder alumni
University of Illinois Chicago alumni
American women poets
21st-century American women writers